This Happy Breed is a 1944 British Technicolor drama film directed by David Lean and starring Robert Newton, Celia Johnson, Stanley Holloway and John Mills. The screenplay by Lean, Anthony Havelock-Allan and Ronald Neame is based on the 1939 play This Happy Breed, by Noël Coward. It tells the story of an inter-war suburban London family, set against the backdrop of what were then recent news events, moving from the postwar era of the 1920s to the inevitability of another war, and the passing of the torch from one generation to the next. Domestic triumphs and tragedies play against such transformative changes as the coming of household radio and talking pictures. The film was not released in the United States until April 1947.

The title, a reference to the English people, is a phrase from John of Gaunt's monologue in Act II, Scene 1 of William Shakespeare's Richard II.  (Laurence Olivier provides the uncredited introductory narration.)

Plot
Opening in 1919, shortly after the end of the First World War, the film focuses on the Gibbons family - Frank, his wife Ethel, their three children Reg, Vi and Queenie, his widowed sister Sylvia and Ethel's mother - after they settle in a rented house in Clapham, South London. Frank is delighted that his next-door neighbour is Bob Mitchell, a friend from his days in the army.

Frank, Ethel and Bob attend a Victory Parade in the summer of 1919. Frank finds employment in a travel agency, arranging tours of Western Front battlefields, run by another old army chum. As the children grow up and the country adapts to peacetime, the family attend the British Empire Exhibition held at Wembley in 1924. At Christmas 1925 the family acquire their first crystal set radio.

Reg becomes friendly with Sam, a staunch socialist, who is attracted to Vi. Queenie is pursued by Bob's sailor son Billy, but she longs to escape the suburbs and lead a more glamorous life elsewhere. During the General Strike of 1926 (in which Frank and Bob volunteer as driver and conductor of a bus), Reg is injured in a brawl in Whitechapel Road. Vi blames Sam, who had brought her brother to the area, but eventually her anger dissipates and she marries him.

In 1928, Charleston dance mania arrives in England and Queenie wins a dance contest. In 1929 Sam and Vi attend one of the new talking pictures at the cinema. News of the electoral rise of the German Nazi Party, led by Adolf Hitler, begins to appear in the newspapers. Reg marries Phyllis. Billy (now a Leading seaman) proposes to Queenie, but she confesses she is in love with a married man and soon after runs off with him. Her mother says she cannot forgive her and never wants to see her again.

After a drunken regimental reunion, Bob expresses his faith that the League of Nations will keep the peace, and scoffs at Frank's concerns about the disarmament policies of the new National Government and the Japanese invasion of Manchuria. As time passes, Ethel's mother dies, Aunt Sylvia discovers spiritualism and Reg and Phyllis are killed in a car crash. The British Union of Fascists tries to stir up anti-Semitic sentiment in the city. Stanley Baldwin wins the 1935 United Kingdom general election. King George V dies (January 1936) and Frank and Ethel join the crowds filing past his coffin. King Edward VIII abdicates (11 December 1936). When Neville Chamberlain returns from Munich (September 1938) with the promise of "peace in our time,” Frank is disgusted by people's enthusiastic response.

Billy, home on leave from the Royal Navy and now a sub-lieutenant, announces to the family he ran into Queenie while on shore leave in France. Abandoned by her lover, she and an older woman opened a tearoom to make ends meet. She deeply regrets having left home. Billy reveals they were married two weeks previously in the Plymouth Registry Office and he has brought her back to London; Ethel forgives her.

With the a new war on the horizon, Queenie leaves her baby son in the care of her parents when she sails to join her husband in Singapore. Frank and Ethel, faced with an empty nest, leave the house and move to a flat with their grandson.

Cast

 Robert Newton as Frank Gibbons
 Celia Johnson as Ethel Gibbons
 Alison Leggatt as Aunt Sylvia
 Stanley Holloway as Bob Mitchell
 John Mills as Billy Mitchell
 Kay Walsh as Queenie Gibbons
 Amy Veness as Mrs. Flint
 Eileen Erskine as Vi Gibbons
 John Blythe as Reg Gibbons
 Guy Verney as Sam Leadbitter
 Betty Fleetwood as Phyllis Blake
 Merle Tottenham as Edie, the Gibbons' maid

Production
In 1942, David Lean and Noël Coward co-directed In Which We Serve. This Happy Breed marked Lean's solo directorial debut. He and Coward later teamed for Brief Encounter and Blithe Spirit.

Writing for TCM in February 2006, Frank Tatara says: “To a certain degree, Coward tried to have it both ways with This Happy Breed. By this point in his career, he had already cultivated the aura of high-breeding that informed most of his work. But he was raised in the same working-class environment that's covered in both his play and Lean's picture, and some of his collaborators noted a bit of a mean streak in his writing, even as he sought to celebrate the 'common' Brit. 'There is something condescending about the writing,' Anthony Havelock-Allan, the film's co-producer and co-screenwriter, noted. 'The condescension is that he escaped from it and really, how awful they were, seen from his superior and, by adoption, upper-class attitude.' “

Coward had played Frank Gibbons on stage, and he wanted to reprise the role on screen. Lean felt the playwright's public persona of witty sophistication was so far removed from his humble lower class origins that audiences would be unable to accept him as Gibbons, and he initially offered the role to Robert Donat instead.  Donat refused the role because he objected to the final speech delivered by his character in the stage version.  As he explained in a letter to Coward: "Rightly or wrongly, I believe it is just that very political irresponsibility that got us into another war". The role was given to Robert Newton, whose reputation for alcoholism led the producers to require Newton to sign a contract relinquishing £500 of his  £9,000 salary, every time his drinking caused a delay in production. According to the film's cameraman Ronald Neame, by the end of filming, Newton had forfeited his entire salary, although the producers forgave him and paid his full fee.
 
Lean insisted on filming This Happy Breed on three-strip Technicolor stock, although the film was difficult to acquire in Britain during the war. At the time, a Technicolor representative was assigned to the set of every film that utilised the process to ensure everything looked right on film. Lean was contractually required to follow strictly the guidelines proposed by the consultant, whose expertise he questioned and who drove him to distraction because of her concentration on the minutest details. The released film barely resembles a standard Technicolor film, which was Lean's intention. It proved to be the most successful British release of 1944 and the first of many critically acclaimed films directed by him.

In an article on BFI's Screenonline website, Janet Moat singles out “the breathtaking opening sequence, a stunning aerial view of London, from the Thames and across the rooftops, down to the back door of one particular house and right through it to the front door”, narrated by Laurence Olivier. “Lean was already employing one of his trademark devices of 'leaking' one scene into another - a new scene begins before the previous one has quite faded away. He especially uses sound to anticipate the next scene, keeping the audience in a constant state of expectation. One sequence in particular uses sound quite brilliantly. When Reg and his wife are killed in a car crash, Vi goes out into the garden to find Frank and Ethel and tell them the awful news. The camera stays in the living room while the radio plays a loud dance tune, and the happy sound of children playing outside is heard. Eventually Frank and Ethel come into the frame, from the garden, the soundtrack making a poignant counterpoint to their silent grief.”

Between March 2006 and January 2008, the restoration of This Happy Breed, combining digital and photochemical techniques, was carried out at the British Film Institute's National Archive's Conservation Centre in Berkhamsted and at Cineric, a post-production facility which combines optical printing and photochemical restoration with innovative digital techniques, in New York City. The project included correcting the colour and a full digital restoration of the picture and soundtrack. The most time-consuming part of the sound restoration process involved removing background noise that caused dialogue to become muffled when conventional methods of noise reduction were used to remove it. Technicians had to filter the noise between individual words to eliminate static. The restored film was screened as part of a major David Lean retrospective at BFI Southbank in mid-2008.

The film's soundtrack, which includes the song London Pride, was performed by the London Symphony Orchestra, conducted by Muir Mathieson.

Reception
According to Kinematograph Weekly the 'biggest winners' at the box office in 1944 Britain were For Whom the Bell Tolls, This Happy Breed, Song of Bernadette, Going My Way, This Is the Army, Jane Eyre, The Story of Dr Wassell, Cover Girl, White Cliffs of Dover, Sweet Rosie O'Grady and Fanny By Gaslight. Breed was the biggest British hit of the year followed by Fanny By Gaslight, The Way Ahead and Love Story.

In his April 14, 1947, review for The New York Times, Bosley Crowther noted the four year delay: “Why its release here should be tardy is a puzzler to us. For "This Happy Breed," (is) an absorbing and affecting panorama of English life… (It) has a quiet charm and gentle penetration of human nature which should give it wide appeal… the story of… a plain and inconsequential family living in one of those plain little houses in a row in a plain and inconsequential London suburb between 1919 and 1939. ….Through it all, 'Mum' and 'Dad' pursue their steady and inevitably hum-drum lives, partaking of joys and sorrows as they are naturally visited upon them. Grandma and maiden Aunt Sylvia are thorns in their patient sides, but even the crotchets of these females would be missed… crises are usually soothed by a cup of hot tea. 'It's up to us ordinary people to keep things steady,' says Dad. And there you are…. Producer Anthony Havelock-Allan, Director David Lean and Ronald Neame, the cameraman… show us a house, a neighborhood and people of a wholly credible sort, and they have drawn from their excellent performers some of the neatest characterizations you'd want to see. Robert Newton and Celia Johnson (she was in "Brief Encounter," you'll recall) are brilliant as the father and mother—quiet, patient and genuine—while Kay Walsh is shrewd as the way-ward daughter and John Mills is stanch as her earnest beau. Amy Veness and Alison Leggatt are delicious as Grandma and Aunt Syl,.. (The film) hits precisely the humor, the grief and the monotony of commonplace life. Maybe it won't tempt the searchers for glamour and 'escape,' but it should be gratifying entertainment for those who put their faith in the human heart.” 

In a 1944 review, Variety gave This Happy Breed high praise: “Based on Noel Coward's London legit hit, film soundly captures the spirit of the 1920s and 1930s reviving the era of the British general strike, the jazz dress style, the Charleston, and the depression. It touches on the troubled sphere of the class struggle and labor strife, although it has a dubious note once or twice, such as in an apparent defense of strike-breaking. But it is so much more the history of an average British family, with its pleasures and pains, to make this the paramount interest. Film is a bit episodic and choppy at the start, as it unwinds in cavalcadish fashion, but it settles down soon to an absorbing chronicle. Film’s excellence comes mainly in the performances. Celia Johnson, as the mother of three grown children and the rock around which the family revolves, presents a masterful, poignant portrayal. Robert Newton… is also a superb presentation as the steady, earth-bound but intelligent Britisher. Kay Walsh, as the flighty daughter dissatisfied with her lot; John Mills as the loyal sailor in love with the errant daughter; and Stanley Holloway as the nextdoor neighbor, give fine support.”

Writing for TCM in February 2006, Frank Tatara observes: “Coward follows various members of the Gibbons clan as they pass through a variety of highs and lows that make for an engrossing, if rather contrived War-time soap opera. Pregnancy, secret affairs, spiritualism, and auto accidents all come into play at one point or another, with the family stoically riding the rough seas of British life. It's no wonder that audiences at the time responded to it.”

The film holds a 100% fresh rating on Rotten Tomatoes, based on 12 reviews.

TV Guide rates the film four stars and called it "an immensely charming movie, with many tears and many moments of warmth."

Time Out London says, "Though Lean and Coward are less happy here than in the brittle, refined atmosphere of Brief Encounter, their adventurous excursion into suburban Clapham remains endlessly fascinating."

Channel 4 rates it 3½ out of five stars and added, "A toff propagandist's England, of course. But once you've got over its peculiar patrician tones and bitty structure, there's much to enjoy – not least the changing frocks and haircuts and wallpapers."

Radio Times gives it five out of five stars and said "This second of David Lean's four collaborations with Noël Coward provides a fascinating picture of the way we were. ... such is the ebb and flow of events (both domestic and historical) that the two hours it takes to cover the 20 inter-war years seem to fly by. Celia Johnson is superb ....the best scenes belong to neighbours Robert Newton and Stanley Holloway".

Awards and nominations
The National Board of Review named Celia Johnson Best Actress for her portrayal of Ethel Gibbons.

References

External links
 
 
 
 This Happy Breed: Home Truths an essay by Farran Smith Nehme at the Criterion Collection

1944 films
1944 drama films
British drama films
British films based on plays
Films directed by David Lean
Films produced by Noël Coward
Films set in London
Films set in 1919
Films set in the 1920s
Films set in the 1930s
1940s British films
1940s English-language films